The crimson-breasted flowerpecker (Prionochilus percussus) is a species of bird in the family Dicaeidae.
It is found in Indonesia, Malaysia, Myanmar, and Thailand.
Its natural habitats are subtropical or tropical moist lowland forest and subtropical or tropical mangrove forest.

References

crimson-breasted flowerpecker
Birds of Malesia
crimson-breasted flowerpecker
Taxonomy articles created by Polbot